Saint-Gonlay is a commune in the department of Ille-et-Vilaine in Brittany in the northwest of France.

Geography 
The Meu river goes through the town.
There are 280 inhabitants in Saint-Gonlay and the territory stretches over 926 hectares.
In the North, there is the Meu river and the Comper river, in the East is the brook of Boutavent and in the South, the forest of Brocéliande.
The town is part of the county of Montfort-sur-Meu and depends on Rennes. It is surrounded by Montfort-sur-Meu, Bédée, La Nouaye, Breteil, Pleumeleuc, Talensac, Iffendic.

Rivers:
The Comper
The Meu
Brooks:
The Hélouin
The Boutavent
The Planchette
Mountaintop:
The Châtel (91 meters)
The Lorinou (83 meters)

Population 
Inhabitants of Saint-Gonlay are called gonlaysiens in French.

History 
The parish of Iffendic separated in two and the town of Saint-Gonlay was founded.
Its birth is probably due to the building of a church in the 13th century by two priests of Montfort-sur-Meu.
A priory has also been built and it depends on Saint-Jacques de Montfort abbey.

Tourism 
Tourism management is entrusted by Montfort Communauté to the Tourist Office of the district of Montfort.

Buildings and touristic places 
 The schoolhouse of Saint-Gonlay
The schoolhouse is the former public house of Saint-Gonlay. In the past, it was a dynamic school of the district of Montfort. Nowadays, the school has been transformed into a small museum and shows a class from the 1950s. It also shows photos and presents souvenirs of the former schoolchildren, outdoor games, etc.
 Saint-Guillaume church
Surrounded by its cemetery, it is dated from the 16th and 17th century.
It was apparently dedicated to Saint-Gundlée, king of Glamorgan. We can notice of the front wall two characters facing each other: a confessor and a somebody confessing.
 Noble house of Le Vilou
The house of Le Vilou is dated from the 18th century. It was considered at the time as a notable house. Indeed, back then, a subprefect of Montfort-sur-Meu lived there.
 Public house from the 1950s-1960s, it has been one of the most predominant in the region. Nowadays, the church is converted into a small museum where visitors can find a setting of the 1960s.
 The castle of La Châsse
The castle of La Châsse is dated from the 17th century. 
It was destroyed in 1595 during the French War of Religion, then rebuilt.
 The manor of the Changée
 Bridge Hervil on the Comper river
 Bridge Jean on the Meu river
 La Rousselais on the Meu river

Sights 
The path of schoolchildren
The starting point is on the car park near the church and the town hall. The marking of the circuit is blue. It is 9 km long and goes up and down through the town of Saint-Gonlay and its villages, in the countryside. The hike lasts 2h15, follows the Meu river and offers many panoramas at different places on the circuit. We can then see the town centre of Iffendic, the forest of Broceliande, etc.

See also 
Communes of the Ille-et-Vilaine department

References

External links 

Official website 

Mayors of Ille-et-Vilaine Association 

Communes of Ille-et-Vilaine